Vampariah is a 2016 American horror film directed and written by Matthew Abaya, and produced by Abe Pagtama, Roberto Divina, Alan Kao and William Lee. It stars Kelly Lou Dennis, Aureen Almario, Arlene Boado, Scott Mathison and more. The film had its world premiere at Los Angeles Asian Pacific Film Festival (LAAPFF).

Plot 
Mahal (Kelly Lou Dennis) is a part of an elite squad team of skilled hunters responsible for keeping the world safe from vampires and other creatures of the night. Her mission to rid the world of this undead threat becomes compromised when her fate intertwines with an Aswang (a vampire of  Philippine folklore).

Cast 

 Kelly Lou Dennis as Mahal
 Aureen Almario as Bampinay
 Hilton Jamal Day as Hunter HJ
 Scott Mathison as Kilmore
 Roberto Divina as Hack Daddy
 Alex Benjamin as Kouji
 Gabi Dayers as Young Mahal

Awards
 Best Visual Effects for a Feature Narrative Film in the Los Angeles Asian Pacific Film Festival 2016
 Best Local Feature Film - Another Hole in the Head Film Festival 2016

References

External links

 

2016 films
American vampire films
2010s English-language films
2010s American films